Jieshou Park is an urban type park in Zhongzheng District, Taipei, Taiwan.

Features
The park features the statue of Lin Sen, the former President of the Republic of China. And in the west side of the park, there is a Memorial to the Victims of the White Terror.

History
The site of which Jieshou Park located was the former site of San-Jun basketball court (三軍球場) and sport venue of Taipei First Girls' High School. The park urban planning release date is May the forth, 1956, designed number is no. 71, Zhongzheng. In 1964, the park finished and open to the public. Due to the location is just beside the Jieshou Road (now is Ketagalan Boulevard), so the park was named Jieshou park.
The name of the park Jieshou means celebrating Chiang Kai-shek birthday in Mandarin, which the officials want to please the president Chiang Kai-shek. When the park open to the public, the city official held a Chrysanthemum exhibition for one week.

In 1968, the former President of Republic of China Lin Sen was 100 years birthday, the authorities decided to place Lin Sen statue in Jieshou park for celebration. They use the foundation of the Governor-General of Taiwan Kabayama Sukenori statue for displaying Lin Sen Statue.

November 15, 1969, the Secretary-General of Presidential Office Zhang Qun, which is the Chairman of the Preparatory Committee for the 100th Birthday of Mr. Lin Sen, held the inauguration ceremony of the statue.

In 1972, Taipei City Government decide to incorporated the former basketball court of Taipei First Girls High School into Jieshou Park.

On March 27 2008, Taiwan Government set up a monument of Memorial to the Victims of the White Terror in northwest corner of Jieshou park.

In 2020, Park Street Lighting Office, Public Work Department, Taipei City was renovate the park in Zhongzheng District, Wanhua District and Da-an District, which included Jieshou Park.

Gallery

Transportation
The park is accessible within walking distance South of NTU Hospital Station of Taipei Metro.

See also
 List of parks in Taiwan
 List of tourist attractions in Taiwan

References

1964 establishments in Taiwan
Parks established in 1964
Parks in Taipei